Jessore is a city in and district headquarter of Jessore District in Bangladesh.

Jessore may also refer to:

 Jessore District, a district in the southwestern region of Bangladesh
 Jessore Cantonment, a cantonment in Jessore District